The Rural Municipality of Reynolds is a rural municipality in southeastern Manitoba, Canada.

Most of Manitoba's Sandilands and Agassiz Provincial Forests are located here, as are parts of Whiteshell Provincial Forest and Whiteshell Provincial Park.

Communities

 Culver
 East Braintree
 Hadashville
 Hazel
 Hocter
 Indigo
 Larkhall
 McMunn
 Medika
 Molson
 Prawda
 Rennie
 Ste. Rita
 Spruce Siding

Demographics 

References

External links 

 the Rural Municipality of Reynolds website
 Manitoba Historical Society - Rural Municipality of Reynolds
 Map of Reynolds R.M. at Statcan

Rural municipalities in Manitoba